Marca District is one of ten districts of the Recuay Province in Peru.

Localities 

 Ichoca

Mountains 
 Kuntur Qaqa
 Puka Qaqa
 Qulluta

References

Districts of the Recuay Province
Districts of the Ancash Region